Quirino O. Navarro (born March 29, 1936 died August 22, 2002) is a Filipino nuclear physicist and chemist who studied isotopes of californium, dysprosium, and einsteinium. His work was published in two books and three volumes and even became useful for teaching students in the University of California. In 1956 he graduated from the University of the Philippines with a bachelor's degree in chemistry and by 1962 he got his Ph.D. in nuclear chemistry from the University of California.

References

External links
Quirino O. Navarro on the National Academy of Science and Technology

1936 births
Living people
Filipino chemists
Filipino physicists